Jamsrangiin Ölzii-Orshikh (born 14 June 1967 – April 29, 2019; Mongolian: Жамсрангийн Өлзий-Орших) was a Mongolian cyclist. He competed in two events at the 1992 Summer Olympics.

Palmares

2001
 Mongolian road champion
 Mongolian time trial champion
2002
1st stage Tour of Bulgaria
Perlis Open
2003
 Mongolian road champion
 Mongolian time trial champion
2005
 Mongolian road champion
 Mongolian time trial champion
3rd Tour of Siam
2006
 Mongolian road champion
 Mongolian time trial champion
5th stage Tour of Siam
6th stage Tour d'Indonesia
2007
 Mongolian road champion
2009
3rd Mongolian road championship

References

External links
 

1967 births
2019 deaths
Mongolian male cyclists
Olympic cyclists of Mongolia
Cyclists at the 1992 Summer Olympics
Place of birth missing
Cyclists at the 1994 Asian Games
Cyclists at the 1998 Asian Games
Cyclists at the 2002 Asian Games
Cyclists at the 2006 Asian Games
Asian Games competitors for Mongolia